Nadi Djaouhara Ksar Hirane is an Algerian football club based in Ksar El Hirane, Laghouat Province. The club currently plays in the Ligue Régionale de football de Ouargla of the Ligue Régional I.

References

Football clubs in Algeria
Laghouat Province
Sports clubs in Algeria
Association football clubs established in 2006
2006 establishments in Algeria